Medininkai is a village in Lithuania.

Medininkai can also refer to:

 Medininkai Castle, a castle in the village
 Medininkai Incident, multiple Soviet OMON assaults on Lithuanian border posts in 1991
 Medininkai Gate, an alternative name for Gate of Dawn in Vilnius
 Varniai, city in Lithuania, was previously referred to as Medininkai
 Battle of Medininkai, a battle in 1320 between the Teutonic Knights and Samogitians